This is a survey of the postage stamps and early postal history of Sudan. Sudan was governed by the United Kingdom and Egypt from 1898. Independence was proclaimed on 1 January, 1956, and independent Sudan became a member of the Universal Postal Union (UPU) on 27 July 1956.

Early postal services
The first post offices to be opened in Turkish-Egyptian Sudan were in 1867 at Suakin and Wadi Halfa; in 1873 at Dongola, Berber and Khartoum; and in 1877 at Sennar, Karkouk, Fazoglu, El-Gadarif, El-Obeid, Al-Fasher and Fashoda (now Kodok).

The Mahdist revolt, which began in 1881, resulted in all Egyptian post offices being closed by 1884. It culminated in the fall of Khartoum and the death of the British governor Charles George Gordon (Gordon of Khartoum) in 1885. The Egyptians and British withdrew their forces from Sudan and the country was left with no postal service until the reconquest of Sudan began in 1896. When the campaign started in March 1896, postal service was made available to the troops, but no stamps were used.

Until the issue of Sudan stamps in 1897, the available stamps were Egyptian stamps. The amount of mail was small and only a few stamps were used. Between March and July 1885 2½d and 5d British postage stamps were used in Suakin. Indian stamps are also known to have been used in the same area, postmarked Sawakin or Souakin, between 1884 and 1899.

The provisional stamps of 1897
On 1 March 1897, contemporary Egyptian postage stamps, overprinted SOUDAN in French and Arabic, were made available in the post offices. The values which appeared were 1, 2, 3 and 5 milliemes and 1, 2, 5 and 10 piastres. The overprinting was done at the Imprimerie Nationale, Boulaq, Cario, Egypt.

The Camel issue
On 1 March 1898 the so-called “Camel” or “Desert Postman” stamps, printed by Thomas De La Rue & Co were issued. The design of the stamps is based on an original sketch by Colonel E S Stanton C M G, who produced it at the request of Sir Herbert Kitchener. This design continued to be used in Sudan for its definitive stamps until 1948.

Post Office training
A number of Sudanese stamps have been overprinted SCHOOL for use at the post office training school.

Postal stationery 
The first items of postal stationery to be issued for the Sudan were postcards, post paid envelopes and letter sheets in 1887 and newspaper wrappers in 1898. These were produced by overprinting Egyptian postal stationery. Registration envelopes were first issued in 1908 and aerogrammes were first issued in 1951.

Telegraph stamps

A number of stamps were produced around 1898 for use on military telegraphs. The stamps are in two halves.

Collecting Sudanese stamps
In 1977 the Sudan Study Group (SSG) was founded by a group of dedicated collectors to study the stamps and postal history of Sudan, nowadays including as well the Republic of South Sudan which became independent from Sudan on 9 July 2011. The SSG has a website with information about their activities and publications.  On Facebook the group “Sudan Stamp Collecting” shares information on stamps of Sudan.

See also
List of people on stamps of Sudan
Postage stamps and postal history of South Sudan

References and sources
References

Sources

Stanley Gibbons Stamp Catalogue, Part 1, British Commonwealth

Philately of Sudan
History of Sudan